is a 1963 Japanese Jidaigeki film directed by Tokuzō Tanaka. The film was adapted from the novel Nemuri Kyōshirō Buraihikai written by Renzaburō Shibata. It is the first film of a classic Japanese samurai film series Nemuri Kyōshirō.

Plot
Source:

Nemuri Kyōshirō is a mixed-blood swordsman. One day, Kyōshirō is attacked by Ninja on his way to a riverside tea-house. A few days later, Kyōshirō has a visit from Chisa, who serves the Kaga Maeda clan. She asks Kyōshirō to protect her from a Chinese man named Chen Sun. Kyōshirō accept her request. However Kyōshirō later hears a surprising fact from Chen Sun.

Cast
 Ichikawa Raizō as Nemuri Kyōshirō 
 Tomisaburo Wakayama as Chen Sun (He is a master of Shorinji Kempo.)
 Tamao Nakamura as Chisa
 Katuhiko Kobayashi as Kinpachi
 Kyōko Ogimachi as Utakichi
 Chitose Maki as Mojiwaka
 Sawamura Sōnosuke as Maeda
 Saburo Date as Zeniya Gohei

References

External links
 Enter Kyōshirō Nemuri the Swordman at Kadokawa/Daiei

Jidaigeki films
Samurai films
Daiei Film films
Films directed by Tokuzō Tanaka
1960s Japanese films